The Chrysler flathead engine is a flathead automotive engine manufactured by the Chrysler Corporation from 1924 through the early 1960s. The flathead engine came in four-,six-, and eight-cylinder configurations and varying displacement, with both a cast iron and cast aluminum cylinder head. It was installed in Chrysler, DeSoto, Dodge and Plymouth branded vehicles.

Straight-4
Chrysler introduced a straight-four derivative of their new flathead straight-six in 1926. Initially used by Chrysler, the straight-four was fitted to Plymouth and Dodge light trucks beginning in 1929, lasting in production through 1933.

The original version displaced  and produced 38 hp (28 kW). Power was initially rated the same but was upped to 45 hp (34 kW) during the 1928 model year.

It also equipped Dodge light trucks in 1929–1930. The engine was slightly revised for 1931 with 56 hp (42 kW) and 1932 with 65 hp (48 kW) for Plymouth only, Dodge continued with the 48 hp (36 kW) from 1931 to 1933. A small-bore version was developed for export markets in 1931, with a narrower bore which brought the RAC rating down from 21 to 15.6 hp. For 1932 the bore was made a little slimmer yet, bringing the tax horsepower rating to just beneath 15.5.

Chrysler did not offer a four-cylinder engine again until 1981 with the Chrysler 2.2 & 2.5 engine used in the Chrysler K platform.

Straight-6

There were essentially two lines of flathead inline-sixes made by the Chrysler Corporation. Chrysler and DeSoto used a longer  block with greater cylinder spacing, while Dodge and Plymouth shared a  block. There is one exception to this: when Chrysler established an engine foundry in Windsor, Canada in 1938, it was decided to only use the long block for all Canadian-built engines. These engines received a trailing "C" in their designation, becoming P8C for example. Thanks to judicious dimensioning, the Canadian 201- and 218-cubic inch engines had nearly identical displacement to their American cousins.

Beginning in 1938, the  inline-six was used in Massey Harris's Model 101 tractor (later known as the 101 Super). In 1940, Chrysler's  straight six went into Massey's 201 Super, which lasted until 1942.

During World War II, the  flathead six was used as the basis for the Chrysler A57 multibank tank engine.

The last automotive use of the Chrysler flathead inline-six was in 1964. It was replaced by the much more efficient OHV slant-6 released in the year 1958,  which appeared in most Dodge trucks starting in 1961, but the predecessor of the OHV slant-6 was the 230-cubic-inch flathead six and the last automotive use of Chrysler flathead engine was 251-cubic-inch Chrysler flathead inline-six engine. According to the Standard Catalog of American Light-Duty Trucks, the Dodge Power Wagon WM300 used the 215 inline six until 1968. The Dodge WM300 was dropped for the 1969 production year. The flathead remained in production until the early 1970s for industrial and agricultural use.

Straight-8

See also

 List of Chrysler engines

References

Flathead
Straight-six engines
Gasoline engines by model
Straight-four engines